The Swift 009.c was the second CART chassis designed and built by Swift Engineering. Newman-Haas Racing and Della Penna Motorsports entered the chassis during the 1998 CART season.

History
After a successful campaign in 1997, in which the Swift 007.i, won the season opener, successor for the car was designed for 1998. The car was designed by David Bruns in cooperation with Haas CNC. Swift Engineering planned to build six chassis each billing around $425,000.

The Swift 009.c made a stunning debut with Michael Andretti winning the season opener and Christian Fittipaldi finishing fourth. All four entered Swift chassis finished the race. The American built chassis proved to be fast when Andretti also noted the fastest time in the Goodyear tire test at Gateway International Raceway. Andretti finished second in the race at the St. Louis circuit. The best result for Fittipaldi were two third places at Road America and Surfers Paradise. The Brazilian had a heavy crash in opening practice at the Milwaukee Mile. Fittipaldi was knocked unconscious but had no serious injuries despite his chassis being split in half. For the race Fittipaldi was replaced by Team Penske test driver Roberto Moreno.

A third Swift 009.c chassis was entered by Della Penna Motorsports for Richie Hearn. Hearn's best result was a fifth place finish at Michigan International Speedway. Hearn beat both Newman-Haas Racing entries.

Swift secured the second place in the constructors championship. Second to only the dominant Reynard 98i chassis.

Complete CART results
(key) (results in bold indicate pole position) (results in italics indicate fastest lap)

References

American Championship racing cars
Swift Engineering vehicles
1998 in CART